Manirul Islam is an Indian politician. He was elected to the West Bengal Legislative Assembly from Labpur in the 2016 West Bengal Legislative Assembly election as a member of the All India Trinamool Congress. He joined Bharatiya Janata Party in June 2019. He contested as an Independent candidate in the 2021 West Bengal Legislative Assembly Election.

References

Living people
West Bengal MLAs 2016–2021
Bharatiya Janata Party politicians from West Bengal
People from Birbhum district
Year of birth missing (living people)
Former members of Trinamool Congress